Inka Inari Hopsu (born 25 September 1976 in Espoo) is a Finnish politician currently serving in the Parliament of Finland for the Green League at the Uusimaa constituency.

References

External links 
 Inka HOPSU, Member of Finnish Parliament: “I'm happy I was able to participate in politics as a woman with small babies” — Interview of Inka Hopsu for Caucasian Journal

1976 births
Living people
People from Espoo
Green League politicians
Members of the Parliament of Finland (2019–23)
21st-century Finnish women politicians
Women members of the Parliament of Finland